Geoff Bell may refer to:

Geoff Bell (rugby league) (born 1973), Australian rugby league footballer
Geoff Bell (actor) (born 1963), British actor
Geoffrey Bell (born 1939), British economist and banker
Geoffrey Bell (cricketer) (1896–1984), English cricketer and educationalist

See also
Jeffrey Bell (disambiguation)